The Sudan Catholic Bishops' Conference (SCBC) consists of all the archbishops and bishops of South Sudan and Sudan.

Conference history 
The first meeting of the Ordinaries of Sudan held in Khartoum in late 1929, during the visit of the Apostolic Delegate for East Africa, based in Mombasa, Kenya, Arthur Hinsley.

In the fifties were held periodic meetings of the Ordinaries of Sudan, until in December 1974 was established the local hierarchy and the Sudan was born Episcopal Conference, who in 1976 became known as the Sudan Catholic Bishops' Conference (SCBC).

Sudan Catholic Bishops's Conference 
Its headquarters is in Khartoum. The statutes were approved by the Holy See in 1989.
The SCBC is a member of the Association of Member Episcopal Conferences in Eastern Africa   (AMECEA) and Symposium of Episcopal Conferences of Africa and Madagascar (SECAM).

List of presidents of the Bishops' Conference 
1970-1973: Ireneus Wien Dud, Bishop of Wau

1973-1974: Pio Yukwan Deng, Bishop of Malakal

1975-1978: Joseph Abangite Gasi, bishop of Tombura-Yambio

1978-1989: Gabriel Zubeir Wako, Bishop of Wau, and then Coadjutor Archbishop of Khartoum

1989-1993: Paulino Lukudu Loro, Archbishop of Juba

1993-1999: Gabriel Zubeir Wako, Archbishop of Khartoum

1999 - ... Paulino Lukudu Loro, Archbishop of Juba

External links
 http://www.gcatholic.org/dioceses/country/SD.htm
 http://www.catholic-hierarchy.org/country/sd.html

Reference 

Sudan
Catholic Church in South Sudan
Catholic Church in Sudan

it:Chiesa cattolica in Sudan#Conferenza_episcopale